Free Eats is a 1932 Our Gang short comedy film directed by Ray McCarey. It was the 112th (24th talking Our Gang episode) Our Gang short that was released.

Plot
The gang along with other poor children in the town are given a party with games and great food to eat. In addition, each child would be given a food basket to bring home to their parents. It's given by a wealthy woman whose husband is running for office. Meanwhile a couple of criminals have set up two midgets to come to the party as babies. They would steal expensive jewelry and planned on robbing a safe filled with money. Stymie caught the "fidgets" in the safe. After an altercation with Stymie, the rest of the gang come to Stymie's rescue as the midgets pull a gun. An alarm goes off and the police come to arrest the midgets. Episode concludes with the police sergeant spitting tobacco into a nearby waste can, from which the missing midget then rises, telling the "flatfoot" to call his shots.

Cast

The Gang
 Sherwood Bailey as Spud
 Matthew Beard as Stymie
 Dorothy DeBorba as Dorothy
 Bobby Hutchins as Wheezer
 Kendall McComas as Breezy Brisbane
 George McFarland as Spanky
 Pete the Pup as himself

Additional cast
 Donald Haines as Kid getting cake in face at party
 Eddie Baker as Detective's assistant
 Harry Bernard as Officer Flaherty
 Lillian Elliott as Mrs. Clark
 Estelle Etterre as Estelle, a lawn-party guest
 Paul Fix as Elvira, 'wife' of the head of the family of thieves
 Otto Fries as Detective
 Billy Gilbert as Head of the family of thieves
 Dell Henderson as Mr. Moran
 Tiny Lawrence as Waldemar, midget
 Major Mite as Elmer, smaller midget
 May Wallace as Friend of Mrs. Clark

Notes
Free Eats marked the debut appearance of George "Spanky" McFarland. He and his brother Tommy auditioned for Our Gang in the Spring of 1931, with Spanky passing a screen test easily. Tommy also appeared in many Our Gang film in bit roles.

See also
 Our Gang filmography

References

External links

1932 films
1932 comedy films
American black-and-white films
Films directed by Ray McCarey
Hal Roach Studios short films
Our Gang films
1932 short films
1930s American films